The Trail Creek Lakes are a series of five small alpine glacial lakes in Boise County, Idaho, United States, located in the Sawtooth Mountains in the Sawtooth National Recreation Area.  The lakes are on Trail Creek, which is a tributary of the South Fork Payette River.  The lakes can be accessed from Sawtooth National Forest trail 453.

The Trail Creek Lakes are in the Sawtooth Wilderness, and a wilderness permit can be obtained at a registration box at trailheads or wilderness boundaries.

References

See also

 List of lakes of the Sawtooth Mountains (Idaho)
 Sawtooth National Forest
 Sawtooth National Recreation Area
 Sawtooth Range (Idaho)

Lakes of Idaho
Lakes of Boise County, Idaho
Glacial lakes of the United States
Glacial lakes of the Sawtooth Wilderness